Damien Hudd (born 5 February 1981) is a Welsh professional rugby union and rugby league footballer who played in the 2000s and 2010s. He captained Ebbw Vale RFC in their 2010-11 season in Division One East in which they won the league competition. In June 2011 it was announced that he had signed for Ebbw Vale for the season 2011-12.Our

International honours
Damien Hudd won caps for Wales (RL) while at Torfaen Tigers 2003…2004 1(2?)-caps + 1-cap (interchange/substitute).

References

1981 births
Living people
Rugby league props
Rugby league second-rows
Wales national rugby league team players
Welsh rugby league players
Welsh rugby union players